Wild Horse Butte is a 5,760-foot (1,756-meter) elevation summit located in Goblin Valley State Park, in Emery County, Utah. John C. Frémont's fifth expedition (1853–1854) stopped at Wild Horse Butte in January 1854, when Solomon Nunes Carvalho recorded a daguerreotype image of this butte.

Geology
This butte is set within the San Rafael Desert on the southeastern edge of the San Rafael Swell. Wild Horse Butte is composed of four exposed formations of Jurassic rock. The top layer is Morrison Formation caprock. The Morrison Formation is famous for dinosaur bones found within it. Although no dinosaur bone discoveries have been reported on Wild Horse Butte, they have been found just west within in this formation. This overlays the cliff-forming Summerville Formation, which consists of distinctive, thin beds of shale, siltstone, and sandstone. Thin beds and veinlets of gypsum found within the shale suggest a dry climate where ponded tidal water readily evaporated. Below Summerville is the slope-forming, lightly-colored Curtis Formation. The bottom layer is dark, reddish Entrada Sandstone, which is also the composition of the hoodoos that give Goblin Valley its name.

Climate
Spring and fall are the most favorable seasons to visit Wild Horse Butte. According to the Köppen climate classification system, it is located in a Cold semi-arid climate zone, which is defined by the coldest month having an average mean temperature below −0 °C (32 °F) and at least 50% of the total annual precipitation being received during the spring and summer.

Gallery

See also
 Colorado Plateau

References

External links
 Wild Horse Butte aerial video: YouTube
 Wild Horse Butte: weather forecast

Landforms of Emery County, Utah
Colorado Plateau
Rock formations of Utah
San Rafael Swell
Buttes of Utah
North American 1000 m summits
Sandstone formations of the United States